The 2019 Junior World Weightlifting Championships were held in Suva, Fiji at the National Gymnasium from 1 to 8 June 2019.

Team ranking

Medal overview

Men

Women

Medal table
Ranking by Big (Total result) medals

Ranking by all medals: Big (Total result) and Small (Snatch and Clean & Jerk)

Points

Participating nations

References

External links 
2019 Junior World Weightlifting Championships website
Results
Results book 

IWF Junior World Weightlifting Championships
International sports competitions hosted by Fiji
World Junior Weightlifting Championships
World Junior Weightlifting Championships
Weightlifting in Fiji
Sport in Suva
2010s in Fiji
Junior World Weightlifting Championships